Four Wall Blackmail is Dead Poetic's debut full-length album, released in 2002 through Solid State Records.

Track listing

Writing credits
All music written by Dead Poetic.
All lyrics written by Brandon Rike
Except
"Bliss Tearing Eyes" – written by Brandon Rike and Zach Miles

Personnel
Dead Poetic
Brandon Rike – Vocals
Zach Miles – Guitars
Chad Shellabarger – Bass
Josh Shellabarger – Drums

Production
Barry Poynter – Production, mixing
Jason Magnussen – Production
Brian Gardner – Mastering
David Johnson – Band photography
Autumn Fisher – Additional photography
Brandon Ebel – Executive producer

References

2002 debut albums
Dead Poetic albums
Solid State Records albums
Tooth & Nail Records albums